France competed at the 2013 World Championships in Athletics in Moscow, Russia, from 10 to 18 August 2013.
A team of 52 athlete was announced to represent the country in the event.

Medalists
The following competitors from France won medals at the Championships

Results
(Q/q – Qualified, NM – No Mark, DNS - Did Not Start, DNF - Did Not Finish, DSQ - Disqualified, SB – Season Best, PB - Personal Best, NR - national record)

All the following results came from the official website of the 2013 World Championships.

Men
Track and road events

Field events

Decathlon

Women

Track and road events

Field events

Heptathlon

References

External links
IAAF World Championships – France

Nations at the 2013 World Championships in Athletics
World Championships in Athletics
France at the World Championships in Athletics